Olivia Molina (born January 3, 1946) is a German-Mexican singer.

Born in Copenhagen, Olivia Molina grew up in Mexico. Her mother was a German dancer, born in Flensburg, her father a musician and bandleader, born in San Cristobal, Chiapas, Mexico. Olivia Molina started her career as a singer in Acapulco, Mexico, at the age of fourteen. When still in school, she scored her earliest success in hits by Paul Anka, Ricky Nelson and Brenda Lee. Olivia Molina sang in clubs and hotels, and was awarded her first recording contract by the Peerless record company in Mexico City when still a teenager.

External links
 Official Website

1946 births
Living people
Mexican people of German descent
Danish emigrants to Mexico
21st-century Mexican singers
21st-century Mexican women singers